Saints Peter and Paul Catholic Church is a Roman Catholic church in Honolulu, Hawaii. The church belongs to the East Honolulu vicariate of the Roman Catholic Diocese of Honolulu, and serves the Ala Moana, Ala Wai, Kapiolani, Kewalo, and McCully districts of the city.

Description
The church is named after Saints Peter and Paul, who were important figures in the early Christian Church. The parish was established in 1968 by Bishop John Scanlan, and liturgical services were held in several temporary locations prior to the church's completion the following year.

References

External links
Saints Peter and Paul Catholic Church

Roman Catholic churches in Hawaii
Roman Catholic churches in Honolulu
Roman Catholic churches completed in 1969
1968 establishments in Hawaii
20th-century Roman Catholic church buildings in the United States